The 1977 UCLA Bruins football team represented the University of California, Los Angeles during the 1977 NCAA Division I football season.

Schedule
Note: UCLA's 7 wins were forfeited due to ineligible players.

Roster

Awards and honors
 All-American: Jerry Robinson (LB, consensus), Manu Tuiasosopo (DT, second team), Gus Coppens (OT, third team)

References

External links
 Game program: UCLA vs. Washington State at Spokane – October 15, 1977

UCLA
UCLA Bruins football seasons
College football winless seasons
UCLA Bruins football
UCLA Bruins football